Ryszard Witke (9 November 1939 – 27 October 2020) was a Polish ski jumper. He competed at the 1964 Winter Olympics and the 1968 Winter Olympics.

Witke died on 27 October 2020 at Karpacz, Poland, at the age of 80, 13 days before his 81st birthday and several years after having suffered a stroke.

References

External links
 

1939 births
2020 deaths
Polish male ski jumpers
Olympic ski jumpers of Poland
Ski jumpers at the 1964 Winter Olympics
Ski jumpers at the 1968 Winter Olympics
People from Sanok
20th-century Polish people